Solitary Mountain is a mountain in the Big Salmon Range of the Pelly Mountains in southcentral Yukon, Canada, located  southwest of Faro. It is named for its isolation and is south of the Robert Campbell Highway.

Solitary Mountain consists of Late Cretaceous volcanics of the Carmacks Group, a  volcanic group that may have its origin from volcanism of the Yellowstone hotspot some 70 million years ago. Unlike much of the Carmacks Group, the volcanics comprising Solitary Mountain are separated by the large strike-slip Teslin Fault.

References

One-thousanders of Yukon
Cretaceous volcanism